Soundsigns is an album by the American jazz saxophonist Dewey Redman of performances recorded in 1978 for the Galaxy label.

Reception
The Allmusic review by Scott Yanow awarded the album 3 stars stating "Recorded at the same sessions that resulted in Musics, this LP (which has not yet been reissued on CD) is actually more exploratory".

Track listing
All compositions by Redman except as indicated
 "Piece for Tenor and Two Basses"  - 8:23   
 "Half Nelson" (Miles Davis) - 10:07   
 "Adesso Lo Sai" - 13:59   
 "Come Earth" - 8:00 
Recorded at Fantasy Studios in Berkeley, California on October 18 & 19, 1978

Personnel
Dewey Redman - tenor saxophone (tracks 1-3), harp (track 4)
Fred Simmons - piano (tracks 2 & 3)
Charlie Haden (tracks 1 & 4), Mark Helias - bass
Eddie Moore - drums, saw, cymbal (tracks 2-4)

References

Galaxy Records albums
Dewey Redman albums
1979 albums